Barisan Sosialis was a political party in Singapore. It was formed on 29 July 1961 and officially registered on 13 August 1961 by left-wing members of the People's Action Party (PAP) who had been expelled from the PAP. The prominent founding members of the Barisan were Lee Siew Choh and Lim Chin Siong. It became the biggest opposition party in Singapore in the 1960s and the 1980s.

The main objectives of the Barisan included eradicating colonialism, establishing a united independent and democratic Malayan nation comprising the Federation of Malaya and Singapore and introducing an economic system to promote prosperity and stability in society. The party was merged into the Worker's Party in 1988.

Background
Since its formation, the PAP was divided into the Lee Kuan Yew camp and the left-wing camp led by Lim Chin Siong. The common ground of anti-colonialism and independence of Singapore was the basis for the co-operation between the two camps. Differences in their mass bases also encouraged such co-operation. During the early years, the left-wing camp mainly commanded support from the Chinese masses, rural people and trade unions, while support for Lee Kuan Yew's camp was mainly found in the English-educated community. With the support of the working class, the PAP won the third-most seats in the 1955 election and formed the main opposition. In 1959, with the support of the trade unions, the PAP won the election and formed the Government under Lee Kuan Yew. However, the two camps were ideologically and politically different in nature. During its formative years, the left-wing members already showed their dissatisfaction with the policies carried out by Lee Kuan Yew and his failure to fulfill his promises to help secure the release of the left-wing political detainees. Finally, the contentious issue of merger with Malaysia triggered the split within the PAP.

On 27 May 1961, Tunku Abdul Rahman, Prime Minister of the Federation of Malaya, suggested the creation of a new Malaysia state consisting of the Federation of Malaya, Singapore, Sarawak, North Borneo and Brunei. The reactions towards merger within the PAP were divided. The merger with Malaysia was supported by the Lee Kuan Yew camp as a means of assuring Singapore's future security and prosperity, while opposed by the left-wing camp as the merger was seen as an attempt to "wipe out the left-wing forces in Singapore" (Interview with Dr Lee Siew Choh).

The rupture within the PAP was widened by the Hong Lim and Anson by-elections in 1961. Displeased with the PAP government's refusal to abolish the Internal Security Council (ISC), refusal to back down the merger plan and refusal to release the remaining political detainees, the PAP left-wingers abandoned support for their own candidates in favour of Ong Eng Guan (in Hong Lim) and David Marshall (in Anson), which led to the PAP's defeat in the two by-elections.

After the Anson by-election, the left-wing camp planned to oust Lee Kuan Yew from the party but they worried that their actions would cause the British to hold up plans for Singapore's independence. As a result, the left-wingers had a meeting with Lord Selkirk, the British Commissioner-General at Eden Hall, which was later known as the "Eden Hall Tea Party". At the meeting, the left got assurance from Selkirk that Britain was committed to independence and would not intervene militarily to maintain control after the overthrow of Lee Kuan Yew's government.

Formation
On 20 July 1961, Lee Kuan Yew called an emergency meeting of the Legislative Assembly to vote on a motion of confidence in the Government.  Twenty-six assemblymen voted for the government and twenty-four, including thirteen of PAP left-wingers, either abstained or voted against the motion of confidence. The thirteen PAP left-wingers who abstained from voting were then expelled from the PAP. The expelled members, including Lim Chin Siong, Sidney Woodhull and Fong Swee Suan, then proceeded to form an opposition party, the Barisan Sosialis. After the split, 35 branch committees out of 51 and 19 of 23 paid organising secretaries of the PAP went over to the Barisan.

The Barisan was officially inaugurated on 17 September 1962, with Lim Chin Siong as its secretary-general and Dr Lee Siew Choh as chairman. Its founding slogan was ‘genuinely full internal self-government’ through merger with Malaya and it shared the same aim with the PAP-‘the creation of an independent, democratic, non-communist, socialist Malaya’. The main objectives of the new party were presented in following four statements:

 To eradicate colonialism and set up a united national independent state comprising the Federation of Malaya and Singapore
 To establish a democratic Government of Malaya based on universal adult suffrage of all those who are born in or owe their allegiance to Malaya
 To bring into being an economic system that will endure a prosperous, stable and just society
 To mobilise all sections of the people for the building of a Malayan nation

Merger issue

While the Barisan didn't oppose the merger with Malaya, the party campaigned vigorously against the PAP government's merger terms with the Federation of Malaya. According to the merger terms agreed by the PAP government, Singapore would retain its autonomy in education and labour at the expense of the rights of Singapore citizens and seats in the new Federal Parliament. The Barisan Socialis wanted the Singapore citizens to automatically become Malayan citizens with proportional representation in the Federal Parliament. At the end, the PAP government advocated that a referendum should be held to test popular support for the merger. The Referendum Bill on the merger incorporated proposals and amendments from the Barisan, David Marshall, Ong Eng Guan and SPA-UMNO. Three offered options A, B, C respectively proposed by the PAP, David Marshall and the SPA-UMNO. However, the Barisan appealed to voters to cast blank votes on the referendum stating that no option correctly expressed Barisan's thoughts and the three options would "sell out Singapore". This move had been anticipated by the PAP government; a clause had been inserted within the Referendum Ordinance stating that voters who cast blank votes were unable to make a decision themselves and they must necessarily follow the majority. That is, the blank votes would be automatically counted together with whichever of the options that won the majority. The Referendum on Merger was held on 1 September 1962, and the results were:

 Option (A): 397,626 votes (71%)
 Option (B): 9,422 votes (1.7%)
 Option (C): 7,911 votes (1.4%)
 Blank votes: 144,077 votes (25%)

Option A won the majority, with the Barisan defeated.

Reasons for decline

Operation Coldstore

Tunku Abdul Rahman was worried about the impact of Singapore's leftist influence in a unified Malaysia. He demanded that Singapore's political opposition be arrested as a condition of merger. The PAP was hesitant about the arrests as they could damage the PAP's popularity in Singapore. However, the Brunei Revolt of 8 December 1962 gave the PAP a 'heaven sent opportunity' to justify the arrests. The Barisan's open support of the Brunei revolt gave the PAP an excuse that the arrests were to prevent possible communist subversion and safeguard the security and safety in Singapore.

On 2 February 1963, the ISC launched a crackdown against leftists and their supports. Under the action, code-named Operation Coldstore, 107 people including political, trade unionists and student leaders who had shown support for the Brunei Revolt were detained. Among those detainees, half of them were Barisan central leaders. Operation Coldstore was a fatal blow to the Barisan.

Operation Coldstore almost paralysed the Barisan because of the detention of its major leaders including Lim Chin Siong. However, remaining Barisan leaders did not give up their struggle. On 22 April 1963, Lee Siew Choh and remaining Barisan activists launched the "City Hall Battle". They marched from the Barisan's headquarter in Victoria Street to the steps of City Hall to protest the mass arrests in February and presented a petition to the Prime Minister in protest against the 'ill treatment' of the detainees. The protest was put down and seven party leaders including Lee Siew Choh were arrested.

1963 general election defeat

After Operation Coldstore and ensuing protests, major cadres of Barisan were detained or put on long trials. These events severely diminished the strength of the Barisan, which prevented the party from effectively taking part in the 1963 general elections, and the party was eventually defeated in the elections. The 1963 elections ended with a clear victory of PAP winning thirty-seven of the fifty-one seats. The Barisan won thirteen, and the remaining seat fell to Ong Eng Guan who contested under the banner of the United People's Party.

After the elections, the Malaysian Government took a series of actions to further debilitate the Barisan. On Malaysia Day on 16 September 1963, the security authorities decided to launch two further crackdowns on the "left-wing" extremists. In those September and October operations, "some fifteen leaders of the Communist United Front" were rounded up. Some student activists from Nanyang University were soon arrested for alleged subversive activities. In late August 1963, seven trade unions under Singapore Association of Trade Unions (SATU) controlled by the Barisan, were served notices by the Government to show cause why they should not be deregistered. On 30 October, the seven unions which were supposed to close down were eventually struck off the register. In October, the government dissolved two of Barisan's most effective ancillary associations, The Singapore Rural Residents' Association and Singapore Country People's Association.

Intra-party strife

National Service
Soon after Malaysia was formed, alarmed by Indonesia's confrontation and rebel activities in the Borneo territories, the central parliament in Kuala Lumpur passed legislation which required all youth between the age of 18 and 25 to register for National Service. The left-wingers regarded this action as a government move "to counter the left-wing movement" However, within the left-wing camp, there were two different strategies to campaign against the National Service scheme supported by two schools led respectively by Chen Hock Wah, who was a member of the CPM and Lee Siew Choh, who was Chairman of Barisan. Chen Hock Wah proposed a two-step policy called "Principled Registration" or "Registration under Protest". The first step was not to stop persons affected being registered. The second step was to tell the persons affected not to present themselves for rollcall if they were actually mobilised for active service after registration. On the other hand, the camp led by Lee Siew Choh advocated a boycott of the law and proposed affected persons should not even register in the first place. A great quarrel broke out in Barisan and Chen's strategy obtained majority support. Finally, Lee Siew Choh, together with seven other founding members resigned from the party attributing his resignation to the difference between him and other leaders. The party was split wide open, though Lee was persuaded to resume his chairmanship of Barisan on 9 March 1965.

Singapore's separation from Malaysia
The Barisan had fought against the merger with Malaysia, however, upon the declaration of Singapore's independence from Malaysia in 1965, leaders of Barisan declined to recognise the independence of Singapore. Lee Siew Choh, chairman of Barisan attacked the independence obtained by Singapore, stating that it was not genuine and released public slogans of "Crush Malaysia", "Phony Independence", and "Boycott Parliament". Reaction towards Singapore's independence within the left-wing camp was again divided. Lim Huan Boon, who was a member of the Communist Party of Malaya and one of Barisan's representatives in the Legislative Assembly recognised the independence of Singapore stating that there was no such thing as phony or half independence. Lim Chin Siong, another leader of Barisan who was in detention, also considered Singapore's independence to be genuine.

Taking the view that there was neither true national independence nor parliamentary democracy, Barisan began to boycott Parliament and elections. In October 1966, the Barisan had all its remaining representatives in Parliament resign their seats and started what they called an extra-parliamentary struggle. An editorial in The Straits Times commented that the Barisan chose the wrong time to launch an extra-parliamentary struggle:

“To give up the constitutional arena, at a time when none other exists, is very much like giving up politics altogether”.

The departure from the parliament arguably sealed the fate of Barisan.

Final days
By 1967, Barisan had been depleted and its declining fortunes was seen in the contraction of its membership. Within three years from 1963 to 1966, the number of its branches had shrunk to 33 from 36 with only 22 effective. In contrast, the PAP maintained its 51 branches throughout the three years. The Barisan boycotted the General Elections in 1968 and allowed the PAP to win all 51 seats in the Parliament.

Barisan returned to contest the 1972 general election. However, it failed to win any seat in this and subsequent elections. It was clear that Barisan was no longer in a position to function effectively as a political party. In May 1988, the Barisan was dissolved into the Workers' Party of Singapore to strengthen the opposition and applied for dissolution. The application was denied approval as Barisan's constitution required all its branches to agree to the dissolution but none were left. Hence, it was left dormant since.

Communist debate
From the perspective of the PAP government, the Barisan was a communist-controlled organisation which Lee Kuan Yew labelled as a "main open front communist organization" The ISC stated that the Barisan activists were indeed communist-inspired and the Barisan was controlled by the Communists to sabotage the formation of Malaysia.

Although admitting that they adopted Communist tactics for the anti-colonial cause because, at the time, such tactics would gather mass support, Lim Chin Siong refuted the Communist label attached to him and the Barisan. He claimed:

"Let me make it clear, once and for all, that I am not a Communist, or a Communist front-man, or, for that matter, anybody's front-man."

"I was an MBA League member, but that doesn't mean that I was a communist...MBA is far from MCP...Study the Manifesto of the PA; it was more anti-colonial and more communist in doctrine...Of course during that time, the largest surviving party in Malaya was MCP and PAP was relatively new, so it was inevitable the thinking was influenced by communism." (Interview with Lim Chin Siong)

It may have been possible that the Barisan was merely inspired by successful Communist movements elsewhere to end colonialism and to mobilise the masses, and there is uncertainty about whether the Barisan was Communist controlled or not.

"It is not clear whether the Barisan is merely a front for the Communist Party and its executive in Singapore, the Town Committee, or whether it is a party which is willing to accept Communist support, though the ultimate objective did not call for the creation of a Communist political system nor the establishment of a beachhead for the Chinese People's Republic."

References

External links
 Infopedia: Barisan Sosialis
 HistorySG: Barisan Sosialis is formed

Defunct socialist parties in Singapore
Political parties established in 1961
1961 establishments in Singapore
Political parties disestablished in 1988
1988 disestablishments in Singapore